Elizabeth Searcy (1877-1965) was an American artist from Memphis, Tennessee. Known for her commissioned portraits of President Roosevelt, she also painted different views of the White House and of Roosevelt's birthplace.

Biography 
Searcy was born in Memphis in 1877. She attended Miss Higbee's School and went to Philadelphia to study art. She specialized in etchings and watercolors.  Searcy was also an art instructor at St. Mary's Hall in Burlington, New Jersey. Searcy developed a relationship with Eleanor Roosevelt, for whom she did commissioned work that was then given as gifts to President Roosevelt. Eventually, Searcy would move back to Memphis, TN where she died in 1965.

Museum collections 
Searcy's artwork is included in the permanent collections of the Memphis Brooks Museum of Art, the Metropolitan Museum of Art and the Johnson Collection in Spartanburg, South Carolina.

References 

19th-century American women artists
20th-century American women artists
1877 births
1965 deaths
People from Memphis, Tennessee